92P/Sanguin, also called Sanguin's Comet or Comet Sanguin, is a Jupiter-family comet discovered on October 15, 1977, by Juan G. Sanguin at Leoncito Astronomical Complex. It completes a single rotation approximately every 6 days.

References

External links
 92P/Sanguin at the JPL Small-Body Database Browser

Periodic comets
0092
Comets in 2013
19771015